Enrique Burgos Arosemena (born November 23, 1990) is a Panamanian professional baseball pitcher in the Miami Marlins organization. He has played in Major League Baseball (MLB) for the Arizona Diamondbacks.

Early life
Enrique Burgos was born in Panama City, Panama. His father, Enrique Burgos, is a former left-handed pitcher who played in the minors and majors over a period of 17 years. The younger Burgos preferred soccer to baseball, but took up the latter sport at age 14 and signed with the Arizona Diamondbacks as an amateur free agent on July 19, 2007, at the age of 16.

Career

Arizona Diamondbacks
Burgos was a starting pitcher during most of his seven-plus years in the minor leagues, where he demonstrated the ability to strike out batters but also had a high walk rate. His ERA during his first four seasons was 5.93. In 2012 the Diamondbacks moved him to the bullpen, where his ERA decreased to 2.35 in 2012 and 3.88 in 2013. Between 2013 and 2014, he cut his walk rate over 50 percent, from more than one walk per inning in Low-A South Bend to 4.3 walks per nine innings in High-A Visalia. He was added to the Diamondbacks 40-man roster on October 21, 2014.

He was promoted to the major leagues on April 29, 2015. That night, he retired all three batters that he faced in the ninth inning of a Diamondbacks 9–1 win over the Colorado Rockies.

Burgos was recalled from the Triple-A Reno Aces on July 2, 2016.

He was designated for assignment on May 15, 2017, to create room for Reymond Fuentes who had his contract purchased from AAA.

Atlanta Braves
On May 20, he was traded to the Atlanta Braves for cash considerations. He was then designated for assignment by the Braves to make room for David Freitas He elected free agency on November 6, 2017.

Detroit Tigers
On December 5, 2017, Burgos signed a minor league deal with the Detroit Tigers. He was released on March 28, 2018.

Guerreros de Oaxaca
On July 3, 2018, Burgos signed with the Guerreros de Oaxaca of the Mexican League.

Pericos de Puebla
On August 16, 2018, Burgos was traded to the Pericos de Puebla of the Mexican League. He became a free agent after the season.

Long Island Ducks
On April 2, 2019, Burgos signed with the Long Island Ducks of the Atlantic League of Professional Baseball. He appeared in 29 games for the Ducks, recording a 4–2 record and 2.43 ERA with 13 saves and 49 strikeouts in 29.2 innings pitched.

Leones de Yucatán
On July 19, 2019, Burgos had his contract selected by the Leones de Yucatán of the Mexican League. Burgos posted a stellar 0.59 ERA in 16 appearances for Yucatán to close out the year. Burgos did not play in a game in 2020 due to the cancellation of the Mexican League season because of the COVID-19 pandemic. In 2021, he made 25 appearances for the club, logging a 2.22 ERA with 29 strikeouts in 24.1 innings of work.

Burgos made 8 appearances for Yucatán in 2022, but struggled to a 7.36 ERA with 5 strikeouts in 7.1 innings pitched. He was released by the team on July 13, 2022.

Miami Marlins
On January 13, 2023, Burgos signed a minor league contract with the Miami Marlins organization.

International career
Before the 2019 season, he was selected for Panama national baseball team at the 2019 Pan American Games Qualifier.

In 2022, Burgos was selected to represent Panama at the 2023 World Baseball Classic qualification.

References

External links

1990 births
Living people
Arizona Diamondbacks players
Dominican Summer League Diamondbacks players
Guerreros de Oaxaca players
Leones de Yucatán players
Leones del Escogido players
Panamanian expatriate baseball players in the Dominican Republic
Long Island Ducks players
Major League Baseball pitchers
Major League Baseball players from Panama
Mexican League baseball pitchers
Missoula Osprey players
Mobile BayBears players
Panamanian expatriate baseball players in Mexico
Panamanian expatriate baseball players in the United States
Pericos de Puebla players
Reno Aces players
Salt River Rafters players
South Bend Silver Hawks players
Sportspeople from Panama City
Yaquis de Obregón players
Visalia Rawhide players
Yakima Bears players
Gigantes del Cibao players